The qualification round of  Women's 50 metre rifle three positions event at 2014 Commonwealth Games started the morning of 29 July 2014 at the Barry Buddon Shooting Centre, while the final was held in the evening at the same place.

Results

Qualification

Finals

References

External links
Schedule

Shooting at the 2014 Commonwealth Games
Common